Conor Flaherty is a fictional character from the BBC soap opera EastEnders, played by actor Seán Gleeson from 22 September 1997 to 22 February 1999. The character first appeared in a special week of episodes set in Ireland, the first broadcast in 1997.

Storylines
Flaherty first appeared in 1997 when his aunt Pauline Fowler (Wendy Richard) tracks him and his mother Maggie Flaherty (Olivia Shanley) down in Ireland after she discovers Maggie is the sister she had never known about. Conor also has a daughter, Mary Flaherty (Melanie Clark Pullen), from his first marriage but he did not get along with her. When Mary decided she wants to move to Walford with Pauline, Conor also follows her. In Walford, he works as a mechanic for Phil Mitchell (Steve McFadden) and as a loan shark 'heavy' for Annie Palmer (Nadia Sawalha). He tries to compete for Annie's affection along with Phil, but Annie isn't interested. He then falls for Ruth (Caroline Paterson), the wife of Pauline's son, Mark Fowler (Todd Carty), after her marriage to Mark has fallen apart. Eventually,  Conor Flaherty has a secret affair with Ruth, but after they have unprotected sex, he becomes fearful that Ruth will become pregnant and insists that she takes the morning-after pill. Ruth protests and eventually lies that she has taken it. The affair ends, but she does indeed become pregnant. When she discovers this, she decides to keep the child. When Conor's daughter Mary accidentally reveals this to Mark, he is furious and hurt and goes after Conor,beating him up and informing him of the pregnancy. Consequently, Connor decides to move to Scotland for a new life, and he leaves Walford with Mary.

Casting
Colm O Maonlai had auditioned for the part of Conor Flaherty, but ultimately lost out to Gleeson and was later cast as Tom Banks.

Reception
Merle Brown from the Scottish newspaper the Daily Record commented that Conor and Mary were "two of the most irritating characters" in the soap and she was not happy that they were moving to Scotland.

References

EastEnders characters
Fictional mechanics
Fictional Irish people
Television characters introduced in 1997
Male characters in television
Beale family (EastEnders)